This list is of the Cultural Properties of Japan designated in the category of  for the Prefecture of Nagano.

National Cultural Properties
As of 1 September 2015, sixteen Important Cultural Properties have been designated, being of national significance.

Prefectural Cultural Properties
As of 16 April 2015, twenty-one properties have been designated at a prefectural level.

See also
 Cultural Properties of Japan
 List of National Treasures of Japan (paintings)
 Japanese painting
 List of Historic Sites of Japan (Nagano)
 List of Cultural Properties of Japan - historical materials (Nagano)

References

External links
  Cultural Properties in Nagano Prefecture
  Cultural Properties in Nagano Prefecture

Cultural Properties,Nagano
Cultural Properties,Paintings
Paintings,Nagano
Lists of paintings